The Mexico women's national handball team is the national team of Mexico. It takes part in international handball competitions.

Results

Pan American Championship

Pan American Games
2003 – 6th
2007 – 5th
2011 – 4th

Central American and Caribbean Games

Nor.Ca. Championship

Caribbean Handball Cup

External links
IHF profile

Women's national handball teams
Handball
National team